Headwater or headwaters are the sources of rivers.

It may also refer to:
 Headwater (band), a musical group
 Headwaters Tourism Association, a travel region of Ontario, Canada